Mickey Garcia (born October 21, 1961) is an American record executive, songwriter, music producer, and DJ. He is known for founding the record label MicMac Records and for his work as a Mastermix DJ on 98.7 Kiss FM. He has written and produced over 100 songs since 1985 and is considered one of the founders of the freestyle dance genre, having produced, remixed, and written songs for artists such as Judy Torres, Cynthia, Johnny O, Tiana, Colonel Abrams and Menudo. He has been registered with the American Society of Composers, Authors and Publishers since 1987 and has over 300 works in his catalog.

Early life
Garcia was born October 21, 1961, at St. Vincent's Hospital on 12th Street and 7th Avenue, lower Manhattan, to Josephina Montalvo and Michael Garcia. He grew up on Grand Street in Lower Manhattan, New York with 5 brothers and 1 sister. In 1975, Garcia and his older brother Tony began DJing together at block parties and house parties. Later, the brothers went on to DJ at various discotheques around the city.

Career
In 1976, George Vascones of the Latin Symbolics dance company auditioned Garcia to DJ for a talent show. After Garcia gave Vascones a cassette tape of his mix, Vascones offered him the job to DJ for the talent show at the Stardust Ball Room in The Bronx. After the show, Vascones told Garcia about a disco in Manhattan that needed a permanent DJ because the resident DJ Jellybean Benitez was leaving to work at another disco. The Garcia DJ brothers auditioned for the owner of the discotheque "La Mariposa" in Washington Heights and got the job. In 1982, Mickey became a solo DJ and began working at The Clam Bar Lounge on Flatbush Avenue in Brooklyn. Not long after, Tony Humphries, a Mixmaster DJ for 98.7 Kiss FM, invited Garcia to mix for the station. He prepared a one-hour mix show on a reel-to-reel tape for Humphries, who liked the mix and aired the Mixshow in July 1983. Garcia went on to do several mix shows for the station.

In 1985, Garcia attended Kingsborough Community College in Brooklyn and began working at the college radio station WKRB B91 “The Rhythm Of The City” as a DJ on-air personality a few days a week. Along with reading commercials on the air and reading the news and weather, Garcia would play the format music on the program logs and would remix and multi-edit various songs that were on rotation. He would invite recording artists from the New York area who had just released new songs to be interviewed on the air. Soon after, Garcia began working with Elvin Molina, who was then known for creating music demos from his bedroom. Garcia and Molina would go on to create the hit freestyle song I won’t Stop Loving You with a local Bronx lyricist named Marilyn Rodriguez. Marilyn connected them with singer Diana Garcia, who performed under the name Diamond Eyes, who recorded vocals for the song. The demo became a huge hit with DJs in the Bronx and it caught the attention of VIP Record Pool Director Al Pizarro, who made it a hit at the club La Mirage where he was the weekend DJ. Pizarro took a cassette of I Won’t Stop Loving You to play it for a few executives at record labels. It caught the attention of Eddie O’Loughlin, president of Next Plateau Records. He was interested in signing Garcia and Molina as the next producers for the popular group C-Bank and wanted I Won’t Stop Loving You to be the next C-Bank song. The two signed the track to Next Plateau Records and it became the next C-Bank release performed by C-Bank and featuring Diamond Eyes. The song peaked at #45 on the Billboard Hot Dance Charts.

In 1986, Vascones introduced Garcia to Judy Torres. Torres auditioned for Garcia and blew him away with her powerful voice. Garcia offered her a production contract with himself and Molina, then his producing partner, and they began working on several tracks to present to Torres. Garcia reached out to Rodriguez again to write lyrics to various instrumentals on a cassette tape and the song No Reason To Cry was created. The song peaked at #30 on the Billboard Hot Dance Charts.

In 1987, Garcia attended the New Music Seminar at the Marriot Marquis hotel in Times Square where he met with Prelude Records owner Marvin Schlachter. They had known each other for some time as Garcia had played many songs from Prelude Records when he was a DJ for 98.7 Kiss FM. Schlachter asked Garcia if he would be interested in producing songs for MarTru Records, a new record label he was starting. Garcia had wanted to start his own record company but didn't know how to run a label or have the capitol to invest. They decided to create a label together, with Garcia making the hits and Schlachter handling the business side of things. They got an attorney to draw up the shareholders agreement and formed the record label Micmac Records, Inc. Garcia and MicMac Records have been featured in Billboard magazine, Spin magazine, DJ Times, The Face magazine, and The Village Voice.

Personal life
In 1996, Garcia met Norah Alberto at the WPN 9 television station's The Richard Bey Show where she worked as a producer. In 2008, they had a daughter named Isabella Mikaella Alberto Garcia who is an American actress, artist, and musician. Garcia was baptized as one of Jehovah's Witnesses in 2017.

Discography

Albums produced
Source: AllMusic
 Johnny O (MicMac Records, with Johnny O, 1989) 
 Love Story (Profile Records, with Judy Torres, 1989)
 Cynthia (MicMac Records, with Cynthia, 1990)
 Tiana (MicMac Records, with Tiana, 1991)
 Like a Stranger (MicMac Records, with Johnny O, 1990)
 Cynthia II (MicMac Records, with Cynthia, 1991)
 Johnny O (The Remixes) (MicMac Records, with Johnny O, 1993) 
 Cynthia (The Remixes) (MicMac Records, with Cynthia, 1995)

Charted singles produced

Selected productions and remixes

Selected compilations
C-Bank Orchestra - Christmas Is In The House (Next Plateau Records) (1987)
The MicMac Concert - Hot 97 (MicMac Records) (1990)
The MicMac Concert - Hot 97.7 (MicMac Records) (1990)
The MicMac Concert – KTFM (MicMac Records) (1990)
The MicMac Concert – Power 96 (MicMac Records) (1990)
The MicMac Concert – Power 102 (MicMac Records) (1990)
The MicMac Concert – Power 106 (MicMac Records) (1990)
MicMac Dance Party Vol 1 (MicMac Records) (1991)
Turnstyle Records Best Of Freestyle (Turnstyle Records) (1992)
MicMac Dance Party Vol 2 (MicMac Records) (1992)
Turnstyle Records Freestyle Greatest Hits (Turnstyle Records) (1992)
MicMac House Dance Party Vol 1 (MicMac Records) (1993)
MicMac Dance Party Vol 3 (MicMac Records) (1993)
SPG Freestyle's Greatest Hits Vol 1 (SPG Records) (1993)
MicMac Dance Party Vol 4 (MicMac Records) (1993)
SPG Freestyle's Greatest Hits Vol 2 (SPG Records) (1994)
MicMac Greatest Freestyle Hits Vol 1 (MicMac Records) (1994)
MicMac Dance Party Vol 5 (MicMac Records) (1994)
Tommy Boy Freestyle Greatest Beats Vol 1 (Tommy Boy Records) (1994)
MicMac Greatest Freestyle Hits Vol 2 (MicMac Records) (1994)
Tommy Boy Freestyle Greatest Beats Vol 2 (Tommy Boy Records) (1994)
MicMac Dance Party Vol 6 (MicMac Records) (1994)
Tommy Boy Freestyle Greatest Beats Vol 4 (Tommy Boy Records) (1994)
MicMac Greatest Freestyle Hits Vol 3 (MicMac Records) (1994)
Tommy Boy Freestyle Greatest Beats Vol 5 (Tommy Boy Records) (1994)
MicMac Dance Party Vol 7 (MicMac Records) (1995)
Freestyle Greatest Groups Vol 1 (MicMac Records) (1995)
Freestyle Greatest Groups Vol 2 (MicMac Records) (1995)
Freestyle Forever (MicMac Records) (1995)
Cold Front - Freestyle Latin Dance Hits - Volume Two (Cold Front Records) (1995)
MicMac House Dance Party 4 (MicMac Records) (1995)
Freestyle's Greatest Divas Vol 1 (MicMac Records) (1995)
ZYX Freestyle (ZYX Records) (1996)
MicMac Greatest Freestyle Hits Vol 4 (MicMac Records) (1996)
Thump'n Freestyle Quick Mixx (Thump Records) (1996)
ZYX Freestyle Vol 2 (ZYX Records) (1996)
MicMac House Dance Party Vol 3 (MicMac Records) (1996)
Freestyle's Greatest Divas Vol 2 (MicMac Records) (1996)
This Is Freestyle (Quality Music) (1996)
Tim Spinnin' Schommer Freestyle Boom Vol 1 (Tim Schommer) (1997)
Cold Front - Freestyle Latin Dance Hits - Volume Three (Cold Front Records) (1997)
Freestyle's Greatest Divas Vol 3 (MicMac Records) (1997)
ZYX Greatest Freestyle Hits (ZYX Records) (1997)
Tommy Boy Freestyle Greatest Beats Vol 8 (Tommy Boy Records) (1997)
SPG Music Freestyle Greatest Collection (SPG Records) (1997)
ZYX Freestyle Vol 5 (ZYX Records) (1997)
The Ballads Of Freestyle (MicMac Records) (1997)
ZYX Freestyle Vol 4 (ZYX Records) (1997)
Tommy Boy Freestyle Greatest Beats Vol 9 (Tommy Boy Records) (1997)
Thump Freestyle Explosion Vol 5 (Thump Records) (1998)
ZYX Freestyle HitMix (ZYX Records) (1998)
MicMac House Dance Party Vol 2 (MicMac Records) (1998)
ZYX Freestyle Vol 7 (ZYX Records) (1998)
21st Century Adrenaline Rush (21st Century Records) (1998)
Popular Freestyle Frenzy Volume 4 ∙ Anthem After Anthem (Warlock Records) (1999)
ZYX Freestyle Highlights Nonstop-Megamix (ZYX Records) (1999)
Thump Freestyle Explosion Vol 3 (Thump Records) (2000)
ZYX Freestyle Vol 12 (ZYX Records) (2000)
Fever - Freestyle Fever's Divas (Fever Records) (2001)
What If Productions The Best of Freestyle Megamix (What If Productions) (2001)
Divas On The Dance Floor – House Music’s Greatest Divas (21st Century Records) (2002)
PolySound Freestyle Classic Hits (Poly Sound Records) (2002)
ZYX Freestyle Vol 18 (ZYX Records) (2002)
Micmac 360 Tour (MicMac Records) (2003)
Thump Freestyle Party (Thump Records) (2003)
UBL Divas Of Freestyle (UBL Records) (2003)
ZYX Freestyle Vol. 22 (ZYX Records) (2004)
Bangin' Beats - Then & Now Vol 1 (MicMac Records) (2004)
ZYX Freestyle Gold (ZYX Records) (2004)
All The Hits and More! Cynthia (MicMac Records) (2005)
All The Hits and More! Johnny O (MicMac Records) (2005)
DJ Giuseppe D. – Evolution (MicMac Records) (2005)
Bangin' Beats - Then & Now Vol 2 (MicMac Records) (2005)
12 Inches of MicMac Vol 1 (MicMac Records) (2005)
Freestyle Hits Party Pack (MicMac Records) (2005)
12 Inches of MicMac Vol 2 (MicMac Records) (2005)
Tim Spinnin' Schommer – Bringin' The Freestyle II (Tim Schommer) (2005)
Bangin' Beats - Then & Now Vol 2 (MicMac Records) (2005)
Benz Street Various – Freestyle (Benz Street Records) (2005)
Dance Through The Holidays (MicMac Records) (2005)
Coalition - A Common Cause (MicMac Records) (2006)
Warlock Freestyle Mega Hits Vol 2 (Warlock Records) (2006)
Bangin' Beats - Then & Now Vol 3 (MicMac Records) (2006)
Razor & Tie Forever Freestyle 2 (Razor & Tie Records) (2006)
12 Inches of MicMac Vol 3 (MicMac Records) (2006)
UBL Fierce Freestyle Classics (The Collection) (UBL Records) (2006)
MicMac NOW! The Dance Remixes (MicMac Records) (2007)
12 Inches of MicMac Vol 4 (MicMac Records) (2007)
Battle Of The Freestyle DJs (MicMac Records) (2007)
Razor & Tie Forever Freestyle 1 (Razor & Tie Records) (2007)
MicMac Latin House Party (MicMac Records) (2008)
Freestyle Hits Party Pack Vol 2 (MicMac Records) (2008)
Freestyle Hits Remixed – Giuseppe D. (MicMac Records) (2008)
Bangin' Beats - Then & Now Vol 4 (MicMac Records) (2009)
ZYX Freestyle Vol 37 (ZYX Records) (2009)
Edits Gone Wild by Joey "Danger" Altura (MicMac Records) (2009)
Ultimix 151 - Mic & Pep (Ultimix Records) (2009)
Warlock Jersey Shore Anthems (Warlock Records) (2010)
MicMac Original 12 Inch Club Versions Vol 1 (MicMac Records) (2011)
MicMac Original 12 Inch Club Versions Vol 2 (MicMac Records) (2011)
MicMac Original 12 Inch Club Versions Vol 3 (MicMac Records) (2011)
MicMac Original 12 Inch Club Versions Vol 4 (MicMac Records) (2011)
MicMac Original 12 Inch Club Versions Vol 5 (MicMac Records) (2011)
MicMac Original 12 Inch Club Versions Vol 6 (MicMac Records) (2011)
MicMac Original 12 Inch Club Versions Vol 7 (MicMac Records) (2011)
MicMac Original 12 Inch Club Versions Vol 8 (MicMac Records) (2011)
Ultimate Freestyle Dance Remixes by DJ/Producer Giuseppe D. (MicMac Records) (2011)
Edits Gone Wild II by Freddy “The Edit” Rivera (MicMac Records) (2012)
ZYX Various – Freestyle The Ultimate Collection (ZYX Records) (2013)
Club Hits – Mixed by DJ Giuseppe D. (MicMac Records) (2015)
Freestyle's Greatest Divas 2 Exciting CDs! (MicMac Records) (2016)

References

External links

 Website

1961 births
Living people
American songwriters
American DJs
DJs from New York City
American radio personalities
American record producers
People from Manhattan
American people of Puerto Rican descent
American people of Italian descent